River Cities could refer to:
the River Cities (train), a passenger train operated by Amtrak
River Cities Futbol Club, a defunct American women's soccer team
River Cities LocoMotives, a defunct American indoor football team
River Cities' Reader, an alternative newspaper in Davenport, Iowa
River Cities Cup, a soccer rivalry between FC Cincinnati and Louisville City FC